Okanagan College is a public, post-secondary institution with over 120 certificates, diplomas, degrees and programs including apprenticeship and pre-apprenticeship trades programs. Its largest campus is located in Kelowna, British Columbia, Canada.   Established in 1963, Okanagan College has since grown to be the largest college in British Columbia outside the Lower Mainland and Victoria with over 8,500 full-time students on four regional campuses and is the second-largest trade school in British Columbia. Approximately 1,000 international students from over 40 countries currently study at Okanagan College. The College also has one of the fastest growing populations of Aboriginal students of any college in the province; in the 2015-16 academic year Okanagan College delivered educational programming to 1680 Aboriginal students (more than three times the number that attended in 2005-06).

History
Okanagan College was the first college in British Columbia and first opened in 1906 in Summerland, BC.

With roots dating back to 1963, Okanagan College has always played an important role in the development of the region. The name was changed to Okanagan University College (OUC) c. 1995, but the older name Okanagan College was re-adopted on July 1, 2005, as OUC was divided into Okanagan College and UBC Okanagan.

Campuses
In 2006 Okanagan College operated four main campuses, Kelowna, Penticton, Vernon, and Salmon Arm as well as many smaller access centres.

Programs
The College offers a wide array of programs in university arts and science, business, trades, health, technologies, adult basic education (upgrading), adult special education and continuing studies.

Programs that may be of interest to international students include: ESL courses/language training, vocational and trades programs and four-year degrees in both Business and Computer Information Systems. Many students also choose the university transfer program which allows students a smooth transition and cost-saving entry method into many of Canada’s most prestigious universities.  This program includes courses in history, literature, psychology, chemistry, biology, physics and gender studies. Faculty are university educated academics who care deeply about their students. The College also has a long history of successful study tours, student exchanges and customized group training programs.

The College is also home to a number of programs that are unique to the institution, including the Sustainable Construction Management Technology (SCMT) program based out of The Jim Pattison Centre of Excellence at the Penticton campus. The program provides students with practical, hands-on education in current and emerging green building techniques and technologies.

Vice Society Hack

On January 9th, 2023, Okanagan College warned students and staff that an unrecognized external agent had breached the security of their technology systems. The hacker group Vice Society took credit for the attack, claiming to have extracted over 850 gigabytes of data.

Notable alumni
People who attended Okanagan College include:
Jeannette Armstrong
Trevor Brigden
Maureen Gruben
Ryan Holmes

See also
List of institutes and colleges in British Columbia
List of universities in British Columbia
Higher education in British Columbia
Education in Canada

References

External links

Okanagan College Homepage
Okanagan College Students' Union
OC Trades Homepage

Colleges in British Columbia
Education in Kelowna
Education in Vernon, British Columbia
Buildings and structures in Penticton